"Nuttin' to Do" / "Scary Movies" is the first single by hip hop duo Bad Meets Evil, composed of Detroit rappers Eminem and Royce da 5'9", released on October 1, 1998 by Game Recordings. A year later, Bad Meets Evil would break up and Eminem would go on to work with  D12 and Royce Da 5'9" would work on solo projects. Royce took "Nuttin' to Do" for his album Build and Destroy, and he also featured the sequel to "Scary Movies" as a solo song on it called "Scary Movies (The Sequel)". "Scary Movies" was also featured on the soundtrack to the 2000 film Scary Movie. Porn actress Midori is featured on the cover.

Track listing
This track listing is confirmed by iTunes. It features a bonus track by Royce entitled "I'm the King".

12" vinyl

CD

Charts

1 "Nuttin' to Do"
2 "Scary Movies"

References

Bad Meets Evil songs
1998 debut singles
1998 songs
Songs written by Eminem
Songs written by Royce da 5'9"